The Animal Reproduction Research Institute (ARRI) may be considered to date back to 1968 when the first center for bull investigation in Egypt was established. Its main responsibilities were the examination of bulls used for artificial insemination or natural breeding purposes, in addition to examining samples received from districts throughout Egypt for diagnostic purposes. long before that time, however, different aspects of animal reproduction were practiced in an informal, and later, formal manner. for example, artificial insemination has been applied in a primitive fashion for hundreds of years. Fresh semen, collected from newly impregnated female animals, was injected into other female animals.

Objectives
Improving the reproductive and productive efficiency of farm animals.
Field application of the scientific research findings.
Improvement of the laboratory and field studies as well as transfer of modern technologies.
The general goal of ARRI is to raise the reproductive efficiency of farm animals through organized scientific laboratory and field studies. Special consideration is directed towards investigating fertility problems, combating reproductive diseases, applying artificial insemination, conducting research on the freezability of semen, enhancing different aspects of the embryo transfer technique, investigating biology of reproduction issues, and developing programs for rearing calves and care of the udder.

Achievements
Main achievements of the institute in the area of research have influenced and significantly improved the reproductively of cattle, buffalo and sheep through:
Improving reproductive potentials of farm animals.
Diagnosis and control of neonatal diseases and mastitis.
Prevention and treatment of reproductive diseases.
Expanding of A.I and embryo transfer technique applications.
Application of frozen semen technology in farms
Reduction of inter calving intervals
Detection of veterinary drug Residue in Animal tissue, secretion and products
Improving Milk quality & quantity 
Early Pregnancy diagnosis by using Ultrasonography to avoid semen born diseases
Examination of imported frozen semen for examination of females
Vet. Companigns all over the country 
Training of veterinarian to update and upgrade their skills

Departments
Field Investigation
Pathology of Reproduction
Reproductive Diseases
Artificial Insemination and Embryo Transfer
Biology of Reproduction Research
Biotechnology Unit
Immunobiology and Immunopharmacology Unit
Mastitis and Neonatal Diseases
Ultrasonography Unit

1968 establishments in Egypt
Research institutes in Egypt
Artificial insemination
Animal research institutes